Angélique Pitiot (born 1978) is a French retired kickboxer and Nak Muay. She is the former ISKA Muay Thai and K-1 light-welterweight world champion, three time FFSCDA kickboxing and one time muay thai champion, and the WPMF European welterweight champion.

Martial arts career
Prior to her transition to kickboxing she spent ten years playing basketball. At the advice of her brother, who at the time trained boxing, she began training kickboxing, and eventually muay thai. After three years, at the age of 30, Pitiot made her professional debut.

She won her first FFSCDA kickboxing title in April 2011, with a unanimous decision win over Saïda Atmani. After this Pitiot won her only FFSCDA Muay Thai title in May 2011, with a unanimous decision win over Sandra Sevilla.

During the Princes Du Ring event Pitiot faced Claire Haigh for the ISKA World K-1 light-welterweight title. Pitiot won the fight by a first-round knockout.

Turing to the amateur scene, Pitiot participated in the 2012 IFMA World championship, where she won the silver medal. Participating in the 2013 and 2015 WAKO World Championships, she won bronze medals in both iterations, and won silver at the 2014 WAKO European Championships.

In 2013 Pitiot won her second FFSCDA kickboxing title during FK-ONE, with a unanimous decision win over Cindy Perros. In her next fight she fought for her second ISKA world title, the light-welterweight Muay Thai belt, which she captured with a win over Anke Van Gestel. She then fought a rematch against Cindy Perros and won both the rematch, and her third FFSCDA kickboxing title, through a unanimous decision. Following this, Pitiot fought a rematch with Van Gestel during Les Princes de Salm 3. She won with a fifth round TKO.

Championships and accomplishments

Amateur titles
World Association of Kickboxing Organizations
 2013 WAKO Senior World Championship 65 kg
 2014 WAKO Senior European Championship 65 kg
 2015 WAKO Senior World Championship 65 kg
International Federation of Muaythai Associations
 2012 IFMA World Championship 63 kg

Professional titles
International Sport Karate Association
ISKA World Light Welterweight Muay Thai Championship
ISKA World Light Welterweight K-1 Championship
Fédération Française de Kick Boxing, Muaythaï et Disciplines Associées
FFSCDA Lightweight Kickboxing Championship (Three times)
FFSCDA Lightweight Muay Thai Championship (One time)
World Professional Muaythai Federation
WPMF European Welterweight Championship

Fight record

|-  style="background:#cfc;"
| 2015-04-25|| Win ||align=left| Elsa Hemat || Final Fight 2 || Évreux, Martinique || Decision (Unanimous) || 3 || 3:00
|-  style="background:#cfc;"
| 2014-11-15|| Win ||align=left| Anke Van Gestel || Les Princes de Salm 3 || Moyenmoutier, France || TKO || 5 ||
|-  style="background:#cfc;"
| 2014-06-14|| Win ||align=left| Cindy Perros || Choc Des Titans 5 || Le Lamentin, Martinique || Decision (Unanimous) || 3 || 3:00 
|-
! style=background:white colspan=9 |
|-  style="background:#cfc;"
| 2013-05-04|| Win ||align=left| Anke Van Gestel || La Nuit des revanches || Bagnolet, France || Decision (Unanimous) || 3 || 3:00 
|-
! style=background:white colspan=9 |
|-  style="background:#cfc;"
| 2013-04-20|| Win ||align=left| Cindy Perros || FK-ONE || Goussainville, France || Decision (Unanimous) || 3 || 3:00 
|-
! style=background:white colspan=9 |
|-  style="background:#cfc;"
| 2013-03-17|| Win ||align=left| Chantal Ughi || World Muay Thai Festival 2013 || Bangkok, Thailand || Decision (Unanimous) || 3 || 3:00
|-  style="background:#cfc;"
| 2012-12-04|| Win ||align=left| Nong San || King's Birthday || Bangkok, Thailand || Decision (Unanimous) || 3 || 3:00
|-  style="background:#cfc;"
| 2012-11-10|| Win ||align=left| Claire Haigh || Princes Du Ring || Tours, France || KO || 1 ||  
|-
! style=background:white colspan=9 |
|-  style="background:#fbb;"
| 2012-02-04|| Loss ||align=left| Sandra Sevilla || Muay Thai International || Bordeaux, France || Decision (Unanimous) || 3 || 3:00
|-  style="background:#c5d2ea;"
| 2011-10-29 || Draw ||align=left| Zelda Tekin || Who's The Best 3 || Charleroi, Belgium || Decision (Unanimous) || 3 || 3:00
|-  style="background:#fbb;"
| 2011-09-02|| Loss ||align=left| Valentina Shevchenko || Muaythai Premier League: First Round California || Long Beach, United States || Decision (Unanimous) || 3 || 3:00
|-  style="background:#cfc;"
| 2011-05-28|| Win ||align=left| Sandra Sevilla || 4e Soirée de Boxe Thai || Montargis, France || Decision (Unanimous) || 3 || 3:00 
|-
! style=background:white colspan=9 |
|-  style="background:#cfc;"
| 2011-04-30|| Win ||align=left| Saïda Atmani || Finales Championnat de France de Kick-Boxing || Paris, France || Decision (Unanimous) || 3 || 3:00 
|-
! style=background:white colspan=9 |
|-  style="background:#cfc;"
| 2011-02-12|| Win ||align=left| Cynthia Moreau || La Nuit des Titans: Buakaw Vs Boughanem || Tours, France || Decision (Unanimous) || 3 || 3:00
|-  style="background:#cfc;"
| 2010-11-01|| Win ||align=left| Simona Di Chiera || Who's The Best 2 || Charleroi, Belgium || Decision (Unanimous) || 3 || 3:00
|-  style="background:#cfc;"
| 2010-05-29|| Win ||align=left| Anne-Laure Gaudry || Le Nuit du Kick Boxing || Les Mureaux, France || Decision (Unanimous) || 3 || 3:00
|-  style="background:#cfc;"
| 2010-03-20|| Win ||align=left| Aurélie Froment || Championnat de France de Muaythai Classe A || Paris, France || Decision (Unanimous) || 3 || 3:00
|-  style="background:#fbb;"
| 2010-03-06|| Loss ||align=left| Stephanie Ielö Page || Gala de boxe thai de Milizac || Milizac, France || Decision (Unanimous) || 3 || 3:00
|-  style="background:#cfc;"
| 2010-01-30|| Win ||align=left| Chantal Ughi || La Nuit des Titans || Tours, France || Decision (Split) || 5 || 3:00 
|-
! style=background:white colspan=9 |
|-  style="background:#cfc;"
| 2009-12-05|| Win ||align=left| Snooker Sorkorsungrueng || King's Birthday || Bangkok, Thailand || Decision (Unanimous) || 3 || 3:00
|-  style="background:#cfc;"
| 2009-10-31|| Win ||align=left| VIDA || Who's The Best || Charleroi, Belgium || Decision (Unanimous) || 3 || 3:00
|-  style="background:#fbb;"
| 2009-06-11|| Loss ||align=left| Laetitia Lambert || Championnat de France de Muaythai Classe A || Paris, France || Decision (Unanimous) || 3 || 3:00
|-  style="background:#cfc;"
| 2008-12-23|| Win ||align=left|  || Rangsit Stadium || Bangkok, Thailand || Decision (Unanimous) || 3 || 3:00 
|-
|-  style="background:#cfc;"
| 2006-05-13 || Win ||align=left| Fanny Garcia || Muay Thai Fury || Bordeaux, France || Decision (Unanimous) || 3 || 3:00 
|-
| colspan=9 | Legend:

See also
 List of female kickboxers

References 

French kickboxers
Living people
1978 births
Sportspeople from Paris
French female kickboxers